de Buddy's (also known as Jongenszanggroep de Buddy's) was a boys' show choir based in Delft, Netherlands that existed under this name from 1976 - 2005. The choir was founded as a traditional church choir in 1966 as De Nicolaessanghers with 30 voices from 9–16 years. Inspired from the French choir Les Poppys and their hit "Non, non, rien n'a changé" (No, no, nothing has changed, 1970) the choir was renamed and changed to the pop genre. In 2005 de Buddy's was succeeded by re-speKt.

de Buddy's has held performances in and outside the country, including for Beatrix of the Netherlands. Some performances supported social projects.

Members 
The best known buddy, as the members were called, was Jody Bernal (nl) who had a number one hit in 2000. Other notable members were Roy van den Akker, DJ Robin Meijers and Joost Verhoeff.

Musicals 
Some members performed in musicals like:
Elisabeth
Jesus Christ Superstar
Oliver!
De Tondeldoos (The Tinder Box by Hans Christian Andersen).

Repertoire 
The choir produced many songs (pop songs, Christmas songs, children's songs, house music and cover versions of television series and the Kinderen voor Kinderen project) and assisted the musicians Tee Set (1971,72), Herman Finkers (1980), Henny Huisman (1988 and 1997), Bassie & Adriaan (since 1989), Dolf Brouwers (1991), Herman van Veen (1994) and Rollercoaster 23 (2003).

Highlights 
Non, non, rien n'a changé
Going Up Getting Down (on your Skateboard) (1979) #32 in the Dutch Top 40
Soundmixshow with Henny Huisman for the television (1998)
Anti-Haider-Lied (2000), protest song against Austrian politician Jörg Haider "Don't buy from Austrians", which led to a scandal
Ik wille wille Alexander (2001) song for the engagement of Willem-Alexander, Prince of Orange and Princess Máxima of the Netherlands, contest in television show (they didn't know that it was a contest, but won)
German CD project Voll Cool (2002) with songs like Ein Bißchen Frieden.

Discography 
Hoor ik van ver muziek (single, 1971)
Going Up Getting Down (single, 1979)
D.I.S.C.O. (single, 1980)
Liselotje (Pierre en de Buddy's) single, 1983
Tiroliro (Pierre en de Buddy's) single, 1984
Bananas and Coconuts (1992, first compact disc)
Vakantiehits voor Kids (1996)
Hits voor Kinderen (1996)
De liedjes van Annie M.G. Schmidt (1996)
St Maarten liedjes (1996) 18 Sint Maarten liedjes
De Glimlach van een Kind (De Mini Baritons van de Buddy's) single, 1997
Zeg Roodkapje waar ga je housen?, Alle Eendjes housen in het water, House Liedjes 4 Kids (1997)
Een Vrolijk Kerstfeest En Een Gelukkig Nieuwjaar (single, 2000)
Niet Kinderachtig (2000)
Buddy's 2000 (2000)
De Buddy's voor Oranje (single, 2001, for Maxima and Willem-Alexander)
Voll Cool (2002, German songs under the name Die Buddies)
Greek Songs (2003)
Il mostro di Firenze (The Monster of Florence, 2003)
De Reis van Zwarte Piet (DVD, 2005, re-speKt with Bassie & Adriaan)
and samplers, records for social projects like SOS Children's Villages and Kids for Animals, and the above-mentioned assistance.

References

External links 
The Boy Choir & Soloist Directory
Popinstituut.nl (Dutch)
Official English Homepage (web.archive.org, 2005 and earlier)
Successor choir re-speKt (Dutch)
Bassie en de reis van Zwarte Piet (Dutch)

Choirs of children
Child musical groups
Musical groups from South Holland
Musical groups established in 1966
1966 establishments in the Netherlands
Show choirs